MSU Faculty of Geography is a faculty of Moscow State University, created in 1938 by order #109 dated 23 July 1938. There are 15 departments:

Human geography branch 
Department of Social and Economic Geography of foreign countries
Department of Economic And Social Geography of Russia
Department of Geography of World Economy
Department of Recreational Geography and Tourism

Physical geography branch 
Department of Physical Geography and Landscape Science
Department of Geomorphology and Paleogeography
Department of Glaciology and Cryolithology
Department of Biogeography
Department of Geochemistry of Landscapes and Soil Geography

Hydrometeorological branch 
Department of Hydrology
Department of Meteorology and Climatology
Department of Oceanology

Geoecological branch 
Department of Physical Geography of the World and Geoecology
Department of Environmental Management

Geoinformatics branch 
Department of Mapping and Geoinformatics

Research laboratories
Laboratory of Renewable Energy Sources
Laboratory of Geoecology of the Northern Territories
Laboratory of Complex Mapping
Laboratory of Recent Deposits and Pleistocene Palaeogeography
Laboratory of Regional Analysis and Political Geography
Laboratory of Snow Avalanches and Debris Flows
World Data Center for Geography
The Makkaveev Laboratory of Soil Erosion and Fluvial Processes

External links
Official site of the faculty
The Information on a site of Moscow State University

Geography, Faculty of
Geography education in Russia
Education in Moscow